Relangi Narasimha Rao (born 30 September 1951) is an Indian film director and screenwriter who predominently works in Telugu cinema. He is well known for his comedy films, especially his collaborations with actors Chandra Mohan and Rajendra Prasad. His notable films include Gundammagari Krishnulu (1987), Dabbevariki Chedu (1987), Samsaram (1988), Chinnodu Peddodu (1988), Mama Alludu (1990), Police Bharya (1990), Iddaru Pellala Muddula Police (1991), Edurinti Mogudu Pakkinti Pellam (1991).

He has directed over 70 films, mostly in Telugu, seven films in Kannada, as well as one film in Tamil. He also directed two TV series in Telugu. He won a Nandi Award for Best Screenplay Writer for the film Sundari Subbarao (1984), which he directed too. He introduced writers like Diwakar Babu and Sankaramanchi Parthasarathy. He also introduced Telugu cinema actors like Suman, Revathy, and Kinnera to Telugu cinema.

Director of comedy films 
Narasimha Rao made his directorial debut in 1980 with the Telugu film Chandamama. It was a family drama. But the release of the film was delayed and was not screened until the year 1982. His second, third and fourth films, Nenu Maa Avida (1981), Evandoi Sreemathigaru, and Illantha Sandadi, were all successful comedies and he earned a reputation for directing low-budget clean comedies.

Entry into Kannada cinema 
Narasimha Rao directed the Telugu films Iddaru Pellala Muddula Police and Edurinti Mogudu Pakkinti Pellam, both from 1991. These films paved the way for his foray into Kannada cinema. Over the next five years, Narasimha Rao directed seven films in Kannada. He was invited to remake the two Telugu films into Kannada in 1992. Iddaru Pellala Muddula Police was remade as Ibbaru Hendira Muddina Police and Edurinti Mogudu Pakkinti Pellam was remade as Edurmaneli Ganda Pakkadmaneli Hendthi. Both the films starred Kannada actor Shashi Kumar. He went on to direct five more Kannada movies -  Hendthi Helidare Kelabeku, Geluvina Saradara, Ibbara Naduve Muddina Aata, Raja and Enondre.

Current work 
He is currently busy with the post-production of his 75th film Eluka Majaka starring Brahmanandam, Vennela Kishore and Pavani. The story revolves around a mouse, played by Brahmanandam, who wreaks havoc in the life of a young man.

Other works and achievements
He was awarded the Nandi Award for Best Screenplay Writer along with writer Adi Vishnu for the film Sundari Subbarao (1984). 

He was also adjudged Best Low Budget Director in the year 1991 by the Delhi Telugu Academy.

He acted as the Asian Panorama Jury Member for the 15th International Children's Film Festival by CFSI in 2007. He was also a Jury Chairman for the Nandi Television Awards for the years 2005–2006.

He directed a few TV series in Telugu including Bujji Bujjibabu for ETV in 2008.

Filmography

Director

Assistant director
 Sita Ramulu (1980)

References

External links

Living people
Telugu film directors
Kannada film directors
Tamil film directors
Telugu screenwriters
People from West Godavari district
Nandi Award winners
1951 births
Screenwriters from Andhra Pradesh
Film directors from Andhra Pradesh
20th-century Indian film directors
20th-century Indian dramatists and playwrights
People from Palakollu